The 2012 Roma Open was a professional tennis tournament played on clay courts. It was the eleventh edition of the tournament which was part of the 2012 ATP Challenger Tour. It took place in Rome, Italy between 7 and 12 May 2012.

Singles main draw entrants

Seeds

 1 Rankings are as of April 30, 2012.

Other entrants
The following players received wildcards into the singles main draw:
  Alberto Brizzi
  Marco Cecchinato
  Thomas Fabbiano
  Gianluigi Quinzi

The following players received entry as a special exempt into the singles main draw:
  Andrej Martin

The following players received entry from the qualifying draw:
  Henri Laaksonen
  Boris Pašanski
  Walter Trusendi
  Rhyne Williams

Champions

Singles

 Jerzy Janowicz def.  Gilles Müller, 7–6(7–3), 6–3

Doubles

 Jamie Delgado /  Ken Skupski def.  Adrián Menéndez /  Walter Trusendi, 6–1, 6–4

External links
Official Website

Roma Open
Roma Open